Kassandra Carolyn Clementi (born 10 October 1990) is an Australian actress. She is known for her role as Maddy Osborne on the Seven Network soap opera Home and Away, a role she played for over three years before leaving in May 2016.

Early life 
Clementi was born in Adelaide, South Australia and dreamed of becoming a vet when she was a child. She took acting classes as a teenager and decided to pursue that career direction after high school, moving away from Adelaide to study it further. As a child, Clementi would spend time on family holidays in the coastal town of Middleton in South Australia.

Career
In 2009, Clementi appeared in a minor role in Australian/UK feature film The Boys Are Back, with Clive Owen. Clementi successfully began to receive roles in television series'. The first roles she received was that of 'Cara' in Offspring and 'Chelsea' in the television film Underbelly Files: Infiltration. Following her part in the film, she relocated to Atlanta, Georgia when she received yet another role in the American television series Single Ladies, with Queen Latifah, in which she played 'Christina' for six months. 

In early 2012, Clementi travelled to Los Angeles to film the television film Christmas Twister (F6 Twister), which starred Casper Van Dien. Clementi also starred in the feature film Hatfields and McCoys: Bad Blood in 2012 alongside Christian Slater.

In 2012, Clementi received the role of Madeleine "Maddy" Osborne on the Seven Network soap opera Home and Away after auditioning because she was homesick and knew this opportunity would bring her back to Australia. The character of Maddy is a teenager who comes to Summer Bay with her boyfriend Spencer Harrington (Andrew Morley) after running away from home.

In 2017, Clementi joined the cast of UnReal and used an American accent for the part. 

Clementi fronted the summer 2018/2019 campaign for lifestyle brand Sunnylife, that was shot in Northern Queensland.

In 2020, The Christmas High Note, a Lifetime Movie, was released with Clementi playing the part of Emma. During filming Clementi adopted a rescue dog.

Personal life 
In 2014, Clementi dated Australian veterinarian and TV personality, Dr. Chris Brown. 

On August 18, 2021, Clementi announced her engagement to actress, Jacqueline Toboni. Clementi currently resides in Los Angeles, USA. However, as of August 7, 2022, Kassandra confirmed via an Instagram comment that she and Jacqueline had "separated awhile ago, amicably".

Clementi is currently in a relationship with Daniel McKernan of The Animal Planet's series Saved by the Barn. On November 28, 2022, McKernan posted a picture to social media announcing he and Clementi are expecting their first child in May. 

Clementi's favourite book is Tuesdays with Morrie by Mitch Albom.

Filmography and Television

References

External links 
 

1990 births
Living people
Actresses from Adelaide
Australian television actresses
Australian film actresses
LGBT actresses
Australian LGBT actors
Australian expatriate actresses in the United States